The Hook Head Formation is a geologic formation in Ireland. It preserves fossils dating back to the Carboniferous period.

See also

 List of fossiliferous stratigraphic units in Ireland

References
 

Carboniferous System of Europe
Carboniferous Ireland